Wumatang (དབུ་མ་ཐང།) is a small town and township-level division in Damxung County in the Lhasa Prefecture of the Tibet Autonomous Region of China. It is served by Wumatang railway station.

See also
List of towns and villages in Tibet

Populated places in Lhasa (prefecture-level city)
Township-level divisions of Tibet
Damxung County